Jaya Ananda or Chế A Nan was made the king of Champa after Che Nang fled. He won Champa's independence against Tran Minh Tong in 1326.

He was originally from Trần dynasty but had reached high military ranks in Champa, and thus succeeded to the throne. After he died in 1336, his Cham brother-in-law Tra Hoa Bo De fought the legitimate heir, Che Mo, for the throne for 6 years.

In 1342, Che Mo fled to the court of Tran Du Tong (where he died soon after a failed expedition to restore him to the Champa throne in 1353), Tra Hoa Bo De became king of Champa in that year.

See also
 Odoric of Pordenone

References 

Kings of Champa
Hindu monarchs
14th-century Vietnamese monarchs
1342 deaths
Vietnamese monarchs